is the fifth studio album by the Japanese rock band One Ok Rock. It was released on October 5, 2011.

Their single "Re:make" was used in Recochoku Co, Ltd. commercial, while "No Scared" was used in the Black Rock Shooter: The Game PSP video game. The song "Lost and Found" was used for the theme song of Milocrorze: A Love Story movie.

Track listing

 Notes
 : "Coda" is an instrumental song.
 : The song title, "C.h.a.o.s.m.y.t.h.", came from their friends' initial name.

Personnel
Credits adapted from the liner notes of Zankyo Reference.

One Ok Rock
 Takahiro "Taka" Moriuchi — lead vocals
 Toru Yamashita — guitar
 Ryota Kohama — bass guitar
 Tomoya Kanki — drums

Additional musicians
 Yasuko Murata — viola (9)
 Yoshie Furukawa —  cello (9)
 Kazoo — piano (9)

Design
 Kazuaki Seki — art direction
 Daichi Shiono —  design
 Rui Hashimoto —  photography

Production 
 Kenichi Arai — recording
 Hideki Kodera — recording
 Mitsuru Fukuhara — recording
 Ted Jensen —  mastering 
 Satoru Hiraide — mixing
 Kazutaka Minemori —  instrument technician
 Yoshiro "Masuo" Arimatsu —  instrument technician
 Masato — instrument technician
 Naoki Iwata — assistant engineer
 Yuji Tanaka — assistant engineer
 Shinya Kondo — assistant engineer
 Yusuke Watanabe — assistant engineer
 Ryota Hattanda — assistant engineer
 Ryosuke Asakawa — assistant engineer
 Akkin — strings arrangement (9)

Charts

Weekly charts

Singles

Other charted songs

Certifications

References

External links 
 

2011 albums
One Ok Rock albums
A-Sketch albums
Alternative rock albums by Japanese artists